The Museo Geominero (Geomineral Museum) is geology museum displaying minerals and fossils from Spain and its former colonies. It is located inside the Instituto Geológico y Minero de España building in Madrid, Spain.

History
The museum has its roots in the collection of the 'Comisión para formar la Carta geológica de Madrid y la general del Reino' (Commission to form the geographical letter of Madrid and the kingdom), which was created by Isabell II in 1849.

The collection has been housed in its current location since 1927, and was conceived of by Spanish mining engineer D. Primitivo Hernández Sampelayo.

It has been known as the Museo geominero since 1989.

The building

The museum is located in the headquarters of the Geological and Mining Institute of Spain. The building was designed by Spanish architect Francisco Javier de Luque, and built between 1921 and 1925. The contents of the museum are displayed in 250 showcases on the ground floor of the building and three perimeter balconies.

Collections

Mineral collection
Collection of mineral resources
Collection of minerals from the Autonomous Regions of Spain
Rock collection
Fossils of Spanish flora and invertebrates
Collection of fossil vertebrates
Collection of foreign fossils
Systematic collection of fossil invertebrates

See also
List of museums in Madrid

References

Museums in Madrid
Natural history museums in Spain
Natural History
Geology museums in Spain
Mining museums in Spain
Fossil museums
Buildings and structures in Ríos Rosas neighborhood, Madrid